Vacenovice is a municipality and village in Hodonín District in the South Moravian Region of the Czech Republic. It has about 2,200 inhabitants.

History
The first written mention of Vacenovice is from 1228.

Notable people
Dana Zátopková (1922–2020), javelin thrower, Olympic winner; lived here in childhood

References

Villages in Hodonín District
Moravian Slovakia